Satolah is an unincorporated community in Rabun County, in the U.S. state of Georgia.

History
A post office called Satolah was established in 1920, and remained in operation until 1967. Satolah is a name derived from the Cherokee language meaning "six".

References

Unincorporated communities in Georgia (U.S. state)
Unincorporated communities in Rabun County, Georgia